The Christian punk rock four-piece Born Blind was originally from San Diego, California, playing shows in the western part of the United States. All four members of the group- Judd Morgan, Chris Beckett, Kurt Love, and Nate Jarrell- were former members of No Innocent Victim before forming Born Blind. They released their debut album, Pressing On, on Facedown Records in late 1998. Their old-school hardcore sound continued on their last album One For All in mid-2000 on Tooth & Nail Records. Born Blind, toured across the United States, headlining festivals such as Cornerstone Festival and Solid State Festival; before calling it quits in January 2001.

Contrary to popular belief, none of the band members were actually blind. The band name was in reference to spiritual blindness in religious doctrine.

Band members
Judd Morgan - vocals
Chris Beckett - bass, vocals
Nate Jarrell - guitar, vocals
Kurt Love - drums, vocals

Discography
 Pressing On, Facedown Records (1998)
 One for All, Tooth & Nail Records (2000)

References

Christian rock groups from California
Christian hardcore musical groups
Christian punk groups
Musical groups from San Diego
Musical groups established in 1998
1998 establishments in California
Solid State Records artists